Marianne Savage Clark Sharp (October 28, 1901 – January 2, 1990)  was the first counselor in the general presidency of the Relief Society of the Church of Jesus Christ of Latter-day Saints from 1945 until 1974.

Early life and education
Born Marianne Clark, she was a daughter of J. Reuben Clark, who was a member of the LDS Church's First Presidency, and his wife Luacine Annetta Savage Clark. Sharp was born in Grantsville, Utah. While growing up, she attended school in Washington D.C. Marianne Clark attended Western High School where she was the editor of the school year book and graduated in 1919 as the valedictorian of her class.

Marianne Clark then went on to attend the University of Utah, graduating with high honors. She studied Ancient Languages, She received a teaching fellowship in Latin during her senior year at the university. Sharp and graduated in 1924 and continued teaching Latin at the University of Utah and also at Stewart Training School.

In 1927 she married Ivor Sharp in the Salt Lake Temple. For the next decade she lived in New York City. While there, she served for a time as a stake Relief Society president. From 1938 on she lived in Salt Lake City, Utah.

Church service
Sharp served on the General Relief Society Board for 34 years. She was appointed to the Relief Society General Presidency in 1940. J. Reuben Clark tried to dissuade Relief Society president Belle S. Spafford from choosing his daughter as a counselor. In 1943, she became the associate editor of Relief Society Magazine until 1945, when she became its editor. She remained its editor until it ceased publication in January 1971. Sharp was made president of the Relief Society in April 1945.

Sharp was awarded an honorary doctorate of humanities from Brigham Young University in 1974. She  served in numerous capacities throughout her lifetime, including as a member of the board of governors of the LDS Hospital and Primary Children's Medical Center. She was also a member of the General Deseret Industries Committee. Sharp was a consultant to the Ensign magazine and was part of the Presiding Bishopric's Training Committee for the church. She was also a delegate to the International Council of Women to meetings in Washington D.C. and Toronto.

Sharp died at Salt Lake City, Utah, on January 2, 1990.

Publications

Articles

References

Further reading
Quinn, D. Michael. J. Reuben Clark: The Church Years. Provo: Brigham Young University Press, 1983. p. 92-93.

1901 births
1990 deaths
American editors
American leaders of the Church of Jesus Christ of Latter-day Saints
Counselors in the General Presidency of the Relief Society
Editors of Latter Day Saint publications
Writers from Salt Lake City
University of Utah alumni
Latter Day Saints from Washington, D.C.
Latter Day Saints from New York (state)
Latter Day Saints from Utah
People from Grantsville, Utah